Exology Chapter 1: The Lost Planet (stylized as EXOLOGY CHAPTER 1: THE LOST PLANET) is the first live album by South Korean–Chinese boy band Exo. It was released on December 22, 2014 by SM Entertainment. It features 2 CDs and a total of 36 songs (1 CD and 18 songs), including individual tracks from each of the members and studio versions of some of his songs remixed (remix Korean and Mandarin/Mandarin and Korean). The album was released in two versions: a regular version and a special version.

Track listing

CD 1

CD 2 

Notes: The bonus track is "Black Pearl (Rearranged) (Studio Version)", "Love, Love, Love (Acoustic Version) (Studio Version)", "Wolf (Stage Version) (Studio Version)", "Growl (Stage Version) (Studio Version)" and "December, 2014 (The Winter's Tale)".

Charts

Weekly charts

Monthly charts

Sales

Awards and nominations

Music program awards

Release history

References 

2014 live albums
SM Entertainment live albums
Exo albums
Korean-language albums
SM Entertainment albums
Genie Music albums